Robert Ewing Younger (October 29, 1853 – September 16, 1889) was an American criminal and outlaw, the younger brother of Cole, Jim and John Younger. He was a member of the James–Younger Gang.

Life
Born in Missouri on October 29, 1853, Robert  was the thirteenth of fourteen children born to Henry Washington Younger and Bersheba Leighton Fristoe. During the Civil War his brothers Cole and Jim rode with Quantrill's Raiders. Bob was only 8 when the war broke out in 1861. He saw his father killed by Union soldiers and his home burned to the ground.

After the war, his brothers formed the James–Younger Gang with Frank and Jesse James. For ten years the gang robbed banks, trains, and stage coaches across Missouri, Kansas and other nearby states. Bob Younger is believed to have first joined the gang in 1873.

In September 1876 the gang attempted to rob the First National Bank in Northfield, Minnesota. The citizens included many Union army veterans who fought back effectively, and in the ensuing shootout all three of the Younger brothers were wounded and captured. Bob was wounded in the elbow and later in the chest. Two Northfield citizens were killed in the botched raid.

Imprisonment and death
Bob Younger was convicted and sentenced to life imprisonment. He died of tuberculosis in prison at Stillwater, Minnesota on September 16, 1889, at the age of 35 years. His body was shipped to Lee's Summit, Missouri where a funeral was held. He was buried in the Lee's Summit Cemetery.

Film and television portrayal
Days of Jesse James (1939) portrayed by Forrest Dillon
Bad Men of Missouri (1941) portrayed by Wayne Morris
The Younger Brothers (1949) portrayed by James Brown
The Great Missouri Raid (1951) portrayed by Paul Lees
Best of the Badmen (1951) portrayed by Jack Beutel
The True Story of Jesse James (1957) portrayed by Anthony Ray
Bronco (1960) portrayed by Bill Tennant
Young Jesse James (1960) portrayed by Robert Palmer
The Legend of Jesse James (1966) portrayed by Tim McIntire
The Intruders (1970) portrayed by Zalman King
The Great Northfield Minnesota Raid (1972) portrayed by Matt Clark
Poor Devil (1973) portrayed by Nicholas Georgiade
The Long Riders (1980) portrayed by Robert Carradine
Frank & Jesse (1995) portrayed by Todd Field
American Outlaws (2001) portrayed by Will McCormack
Shootout! (2005) portrayed by Keith Lewis

External links
 
Younger family genealogy on the official website for the family of Jesse James: Stray Leaves, A James Family in America Since 1650

James–Younger Gang
American bank robbers
Outlaws of the American Old West
19th-century deaths from tuberculosis
People from Lee's Summit, Missouri
1853 births
1889 deaths
People of Missouri in the American Civil War
American prisoners sentenced to life imprisonment
American people who died in prison custody
Tuberculosis deaths in Minnesota
Prisoners sentenced to life imprisonment by the United States federal government
Prisoners who died in United States federal government detention
Gunslingers of the American Old West